Chaowa Pawa may refer to:

 Chaowa Pawa (1959 film), a film directed by Dilip Mukherjee, Tarun Majumdar, and Sachin Mukherjee (a.k.a. Yatrik)
 Chaowa Pawa (2009 film), a film directed by Swapan Saha